Deserted at the Altar is a 1922 American silent film melodrama directed by William K. Howard and produced by Phil Goldstone Productions. It stars Bessie Love and Tully Marshall.

The film is preserved at the Museum of Modern Art.

Production 
The film is a Poverty Row (Gower Street) production, and was filmed in only ten days.

Plot 
Two villains plan to steal the inheritance of Anna Moore (Love) by marrying her. When her brother Tommy (Lee) is hit by a car, the wealthy driver pays the doctor bills, and falls in love with Anna. This thwarts the villains' initial plans, so they go on to hire a woman to pose as the driver's estranged partner and mother of his child, and stop the wedding. When the woman reveals her true identity, the villains are exposed, and Anna and her rich fiancé are reunited.

Cast

Promotion and release 

The film is notable for its then-novel methods of promotion, which included stunts, such as weddings in movie theaters, and staged "Just Married" car rides around town.

On its release, the film was shown with the short Fighting Blood in some theaters.

Reception 

Generally, the film received positive reviews, although some reviewers thought that "Director Howard has used nearly two reels too much in telling the story" and the plot twists were not believable. There was speculation that more clear title would have improved theater attendance even more.

The film was commercially successful.

References

External links 

 
 
 
 

1922 drama films
1922 films
American black-and-white films
Silent American drama films
American films based on plays
American silent feature films
1920s English-language films
Films based on works by Grace Miller White
Films directed by William K. Howard
Melodrama films
1920s American films